UFC 69: Shootout was a mixed martial arts event held by the Ultimate Fighting Championship on Saturday, April 7, 2007, at the Toyota Center in Houston, Texas.

UFC 69 is most remembered for the main event, in which Matt Serra shocked the UFC Welterweight Champion Georges St-Pierre with a stunning 1st round TKO. This fight is still considered to be one of the greatest upsets in MMA history,  as St-Pierre was the 7-1 favorite heading into the bout.

Background
UFC 69: Shootout was the first UFC event ever held in the state of Texas.

The card was headlined by heavy favorite Georges St-Pierre defending his welterweight title against The Ultimate Fighter 4 welterweight winner Matt Serra.

The co-main event was a rematch held between top welterweight contenders Josh Koscheck and then-undefeated Diego Sanchez. Sanchez defeated Koscheck by split decision in the semi-finals of the original Ultimate Fighter 1 series in the middleweight division; as with all TUF bouts prior to the finals, this was an exhibition bout and is not on either fighter's record.

UFC President Dana White announced the signing of former PRIDE FC heavyweight champion Antônio Rodrigo Nogueira during the broadcast.

During UFC 69, light heavyweights Tito Ortiz and Rashad Evans were in a brief ringside altercation.

Results

Bonus awards
Fighters were awarded $30,000 bonuses.

Fight of the Night: Roger Huerta vs. Leonard Garcia
Knockout of the Night: Matt Serra
Submission of the Night: Kendall Grove

See also
 Ultimate Fighting Championship
 List of UFC champions
 List of UFC events
 2007 in UFC

References

External links

Official UFC 69 website
UFC 69 Fight Card
Josh Koscheck Interview
UFC 69 Review

Ultimate Fighting Championship events
2007 in mixed martial arts
Mixed martial arts in Houston
Sports competitions in Houston
2007 in sports in Texas